George Honoré Brenot (March 19, 1899 – December 2, 1982) was a professional ice hockey player. He played with the Edmonton Eskimos of the Western Canada Hockey League.

References

External links

1899 births
1982 deaths
Canadian ice hockey left wingers
Edmonton Eskimos (ice hockey) players
Ice hockey people from Ontario
People from Russell, Ontario